Nuestra Belleza Sinaloa 2012,  was held at the Modular Inés Arredondo of Culiacán, Sinaloa on June 22, 2012. At the conclusion of the final night of competition, Karime Macías from Mazatlán was crowned the winner. Macías was crowned by outgoing Nuestra Belleza Sinaloa titleholder, Grecia Gutiérrez. Eight contestants competed for the title.

Results

Placements

Special awards

Contestants

References

External links
Official Website

Nuestra Belleza México
2012 in Mexico
2012 beauty pageants